Arescon is a genus of fairyflies. It contains the following species:

 Arescon aspidioticola (Ashmead, 1879)
 Arescon clarkei Doutt, 1955
 Arescon chuk  S.V. Triapitsyn, 2016
 Arescon confusus S.V. Triapitsyn, 2016
 Arescon dallasi (Ogloblin, 1938)
 Arescon dimidiatus (Curtis, 1832)
 Arescon elongatus (Ogloblin, 1957)
 Arescon enocki (Subba Rao & Kaur, 1959)
 Arescon fulvus Annecke & Doutt, 1961
 Arescon gek S.V. Triapitsyn, 2016
 Arescon iridescens (Enock 1914)
 Arescon leleji S.V. Triapitsyn, 2016
 Arescon maculipennis (Ogloblin, 1957)
 Arescon mudigerensis Subba Rao, 1989
 Arescon peregrinus (Perkins 1910)
 Arescon platensis (Ogloblin, 1957)
 Arescon pusillus (Ogloblin, 1957)
 Arescon urichi (Crawford, 1913)
 Arescon zenit Triapitsyn & Berezovskiy 2003

References

Mymaridae